Robert Linn (born 10 October 1985) is a Scottish footballer who plays as a striker, he plays for Scottish Championship club Arbroath. Linn started his career with Dundee before signing for Peterhead. He then moved to Greenock Morton, from whom he joined East Fife, initially on loan. After spending a year in the Juniors with Ballingry Rovers, Linn signed for Arbroath in June 2013.

Career
Linn began his career with Dundee, making his debut as a substitute for Fabián Caballero in a 1–0 win against Partick Thistle in the Scottish Premier League on 18 October 2003, with his first goal coming on 3 December 2003, the winning goal in extra-time in a 1–0 win against Hearts in the Scottish League Cup. On 22 September 2004, Linn left Dundee after having his contract terminated by mutual consent.

Linn then signed for Peterhead of the Scottish Third Division in October 2004. In Peterhead's match against Stranraer on 15 September 2006, he scored four goals in a 5–2 victory, and went on to win the Scottish Football League Player of the Month award for September.

On 6 January 2007, Linn signed for Greenock Morton on a two-and-a-half-year contract. He made his debut from the bench, at home to Alloa Athletic on 13 January 2007.

In October 2007, having not featured regularly for Morton in the early matches of the season, Linn was loaned to East Fife for the remainder of the season, although it was then discovered that the rules only allowed the loan to last for three months. He scored on his debut as a substitute in a 4–0 win against Albion Rovers. Linn signed permanently for East Fife on 2 January 2008.

Ahead of the 2012–13 season, Linn dropped down to the Junior Leagues signing for Ballingry Rovers.

In June 2013, Arbroath manager Paul Sheerin signed Linn on a one-year contract and he was rewarded for his early season form with a new two-year deal halfway through the 2013–14 season. Linn was named SPFL Player of the Year and PFA Scotland Players' Player of the Year in Scottish League One for the 2018–2019 season after scoring 23 goals, helping Arbroath clinch the League One title.

Personal life 
Linn works as a refuse collector.

Career statistics

Honours

Greenock Morton
 Scottish League Second Division: 2006–07

East Fife
 Scottish League Third Division: 2007–08

Arbroath
 Scottish League Two: 2016–17
 Scottish League One: 2018–19

Individual

Scottish Football League Young Player of the Month: October 2005
 Scottish Football League Player of the Month: September 2006
Scottish League Two Player of the Month: September 2015
 Scottish League One Player of the Month: September 2018
SPFL Scottish League One Player of the Year: 2018–19
PFA Scotland Scottish League Two Players' Player of the Year: 2014–15
 PFA Scotland Scottish League One Players' Player of the Year: 2018–19
PFA Scotland Scottish League Two Team of the Year: 2014–15, 2015–16, 2016–17
 PFA Scotland Scottish League One Team of the Year: 2018–19

References

External links

1986 births
Footballers from Dundee
Living people
Scottish footballers
Association football forwards
Dundee F.C. players
Peterhead F.C. players
Greenock Morton F.C. players
East Fife F.C. players
Ballingry Rovers F.C. players
Arbroath F.C. players
Scottish Premier League players
Scottish Football League players
Scottish Junior Football Association players
Scottish Professional Football League players